Christ Church is a Church of England church in Emery Down, Hampshire, England. It was designed by William Butterfield and constructed in 1863–64. The church has been a Grade II listed building since 1987.

History
Christ Church was built to serve the scattered parts of the parish of Lyndhurst, including the hamlets of Emery Down and Bank. Although the parish church, St Michael and All Angels, had opened shortly beforehand, replacing an earlier church, it was considered unable to comfortably accommodate the entire congregation, and was also criticised for being drafty and cold. As a resident of Emery Down, Admiral Frederick Moore Boultbee was aware of the need for a church and had Christ Church constructed at his sole expense. The church cost an approximate £1,300 to build and the Admiral also provided an endowment of £1,700.

The plans for the church were drawn up by William Butterfield of London and Messrs. Hillary of Andover hired as the builders. Construction began in mid-1863 and the church was consecrated by the Bishop of Winchester, the Right Rev. Charles Sumner, on 26 May 1864. With the church's completion, Emery Down was formed as a separate ecclesiastical parish from Lyndhurst.

Architecture
Christ Church is built of local brick with Bath stone dressings and a tiled roof. Red brick is predominately used, with some diapering using blue brick. Designed to accommodate 165 persons, the church is made up of a nave, chancel, organ chamber, vestry and north-west porch. There is a bellcote containing a single bell at the west end. The floor of the nave is laid with red and black squared tiles, and the chancel laid with encaustic tiles from Mintons. Fittings include the pews of stained deal, the lectern and altar table of oak, and the pulpit, which is placed on a pedestal of Bath stone. A wall tablet was installed in the church in 1915 in memory of Admiral Boultbee, who died in 1876.

References

Church of England church buildings in Hampshire
Grade II listed churches in Hampshire
Churches completed in 1864
William Butterfield buildings